"Up on the Roof" is a song written by Gerry Goffin and Carole King and recorded in 1962 by The Drifters. Released late that year, the disc became a major hit in early 1963, reaching number 5 on the U.S. pop singles chart and number 4 on the U.S. R&B singles chart. In the UK it was a top ten success for singer Kenny Lynch, whose version was also released in 1962.

Content
In addition to the hit appeal of the "second Drifters" lineup, "Up on the Roof" epitomized the urban romantic dream as presented by New York City Brill Building writers:

Personnel
Credits are adapted from the liner notes of Atlantic Rhythm And Blues 1947–1974.
Rudy Lewis - lead vocals
Tommy Evans, Gene Pearson, Charlie Thomas – backing vocals
Don Arnone, Bob Bushnell, Al Casamenti – guitars
Ernie Hayes, Carole King – keyboards 
George Duvivier – bass
Gary Chester – drums
George Devens, Bobby Rosengarden – percussion
Jimmy Nottingham, Jimmy Sedler – trumpets
Jimmy Cleveland, Frank Sarraco – trombones
Bert Keyes, Garry Sherman – arrangements

Background
Gerry Goffin would cite "Up on the Roof" as his all-time favorite of the lyrics he'd written. After Carole King suggested that he write lyrics for the tune which had occurred to her while she was out driving, with King suggesting "My Secret Place" as the title, Goffin kept King's suggested focus of a haven, modifying it with his enthusiasm for the movie musical West Side Story which contained several striking scenes set on the rooftops of Upper West Side tenements.

Reception and legacy
The 1980 Rolling Stone Illustrated History of Rock & Roll described "Up on the Roof" as "in every way a remarkable pop song for 1962," and in particular said of the above lyric, "From the internal rhyme of 'stairs' and 'cares' to the image of ascending from the street to the stars by way of an apartment staircase, it's first-rate, sophisticated writing."

The melodic title riff was used in the Drifters version of "Under the Boardwalk", which is heard before the chorus of the song.

In April 2010, The Drifters' "Up on the Roof" was named number 114 on Rolling Stone's 500 Greatest Songs of All Time list.  It is one of The Rock and Roll Hall of Fame's 500 Songs that Shaped Rock and Roll.

Other recordings

In the UK the Drifters' version of "Up on the Roof" failed to reach the Top 50, being trumped by two local cover versions, sung by, respectively, Julie Grant and Kenny Lynch. The Kenny Lynch version, which largely replicated the Drifters' original, was the more successful, reaching number 10 in the UK. The Julie Grant version, which reached number 33 in the UK, reinvented the song as a Merseybeat number; its producer Tony Hatch would later be inspired to write Petula Clark's iconic hit "Downtown", which was originally envisioned as being in the style of the Drifters, with whom Hatch hoped to place it.

Other early recordings of the song were made by Little Eva (album LLLLLoco-Motion/ 1962) and Jimmy Justice (album Smash Hits From Jimmy Justice/ 1963). Also Richard Anthony wrote French lyrics for the song, which he recorded as "Sur le toit" for his 1963 EP entitled En Écoutant La Pluie.

New Jersey-based garage band the Sidekicks remade "Up on the Roof" to serve as B-side for their 1966 regional hit "Suspicions" (number 55), with the track being included on the band's album Fifi the Flea. Another garage band the Cryan' Shames remade "Up on the Roof" for their 1967 album A Scratch in the Sky; released as a single, the track reached number 85 nationally in the spring of 1968 largely on the strength of local success in the band's hometown of Chicago.

Laura Nyro recorded "Up on the Roof" for her 1970 album Christmas and the Beads of Sweat and a single, affording Nyro her sole Hot 100 appearance with a number 92 peak. Nyro's version slows down the song's tempo and also omits the lyrics sung to the first of the original's three bridge sections. Also in 1970, Carole King herself recorded "Up on the Roof" for her solo recording debut Writer, from which it was issued as a single.

James Taylor, who had played guitar on Carole King's cover of "Up on the Roof" and had duetted it with her at her Carnegie Hall concert of June 18, 1971, remade "Up on the Roof" for his 1979 album release Flag.  Cash Box said that the song "is perfectly suited to Taylor's tender tenor." Issued as the album's lead single, Taylor's version of "Up on the Roof" peaked at number 28 in July 1979. Although Taylor would reach number 11 in 1981 duetting with J.D. Souther on "Her Town Too", "Up on the Roof" remains Taylor's final Top 40 hit as a soloist to date. Rearranged around Taylor's trademark acoustic guitar playing and vocal accents and interjections, his version of "Up on the Roof" became a concert staple, often with a star-lit urban dreamscape presented behind the stage halfway through the number as his band played unison ascending notes to echo the song's theme. It was included on his 1993 live album (LIVE) and his 2000 Greatest Hits Volume 2 compilation and was played at The Concert For New York City following the September 11, 2001, terrorist attacks, where he introduced it as representing his and the writers' positive feelings for the city. Taylor and King performed the song together, switching back and forth from one's arrangement to the other's, as the first encore during their 2010 Troubadour Reunion Tour shows.

"Up on the Roof" had its most successful UK incarnation via a 1995 remake by Robson & Jerome released as a double A-side coupled with their remake of "I Believe." Its arrangement hewed close to The Drifters' original; the accompanying music video showed the duo cavorting atop a midtown Manhattan skyscraper. The single reached number 1 on the UK Singles Chart and has sold 890,000 copies in the UK. In addition, "I Believe"/ "Up on the Roof" reached number 3 in Ireland and number 45 in the Netherlands.

"Up on the Roof" has also been recorded by Anita Harris (album Cuddly Toy/ 1969), Kenny Rankin (album Family/ 1969), Dawn (album Candida/ 1970), the Lettermen (album Reflections/ 1970), Ike and Tina Turner (album Let Me Touch Your Mind/ 1973), the Grass Roots (album The Grass Roots/ 1975), Viola Wills (album If You Could Read My Mind/ 1980), the Nylons (album The Nylons / 1983), the Cover Girls (album We Can't Go Wrong/ 1989), Neil Diamond (album Up On The Roof: Songs From The Brill Building/ 1993), Heather MacRae (album I Choose Love/ 2003), Peter Cincotti (album On the Moon/ 2004), Tuck & Patti (album A Gift of Love/ 2004), Marcia Hines (album Marcia Sings Tapestry), Frank Ifield, Billy Joe Royal, and II D Extreme on their self titled debut in 1993 and reaching number 13 on the R&B Billboard music chart. Also Viola Wills' disco remake of the song appeared on Belgium's Dutch charts reaching number 23 in September 1980. "Up on the Roof" is still performed by Rockapella at many of their concerts and appears on the live album In Concert (2001).

Bruce Springsteen and The E Street Band covered the song live in 1975 during the initial Born to Run Tour.

The song is performed by a child chorus in the second season finale of Joe Pera Talks With You.

References

1962 singles
1968 singles
1970 singles
1979 singles
1995 singles
The Drifters songs
Laura Nyro songs
Carole King songs
James Taylor songs
UK Singles Chart number-one singles
The Muppets songs
Songs written by Carole King
Songs with lyrics by Gerry Goffin
Robson & Jerome songs
1962 songs
Atlantic Records singles
Number-one singles in Scotland
Kenny Lynch songs
Ike & Tina Turner songs